The FH Aachen – Aachen University of Applied Sciences is one of the biggest Fachhochschulen in Germany with roughly 15,000 students, 250 professors, 470 contract lecturers, and 340 assistants. It is specialized in certain topical areas (e.g. technology, engineering, business, design).

The FH Aachen ranks as the first best among the Universities of Applied Sciences in Germany in the fields of Electrical, Mechanical engineering and Informatics. Ten Faculties offer 53 Bachelor's, 22 Master's and three cooperative degree programmes.

The FH Aachen is situated in Aachen and in Jülich.

History
The FH Aachen was established in 1971 as a result of the amalgamation of several universities of applied sciences and vocational training centres. Thus, it can look back on a practice-oriented educational tradition going back more than 100 years. 
The Federal Framework Law for Education in 1976 raised the legal status of all Fachhochschulen to a position equal to that of traditional universities. Within the context of law, the FH Aachen, like all other FHs, is autonomous, meaning that freedom of teaching, research and academic self-administration are guaranteed rights.

Faculties

 Faculty 1:  Architecture
 Faculty 2:  Civil Engineering 
 Faculty 3:  Chemistry and Biotechnology 
 Faculty 4:  Arts and Design 
 Faculty 5:  Electrical Engineering and IT
 Faculty 6:  Aerospace Engineering 
 Faculty 7:  Business Studies 
 Faculty 8:  Mechanical Engineering and Mechatronics
 Faculty 9:  Medical technology and Applied mathematics
 Faculty 10: Energy technology

Degree Programmes
FH Aachen offers 48 Bachelor's, 22 Master's and three cooperative degree programmes. Dual degree programmes have been developed in recent years at the FH Aachen in close cooperation with the Chambers of Industry and Commerce (IHK). Some of the degree programmes have an international focus (IOS), which means that the courses are given in English during the first two semesters and in German in the following semesters.

Locations
Seven of the ten faculties, with a total of over 8,000 students, are located in Aachen: Architecture, Civil Engineering, Design, Electrical Engineering and Information Technology, Aerospace Engineering,
Business Studies, Mechanical Engineering and Mechatronics. Furthermore, the Rectorate, the Head Office and the Central Library are also here.
Three faculties with more than 3,000 students altogether are located in Jülich: Chemistry and Biotechnology, Medical Technology and Applied Mathematics as well as Energy Technology.
All services for students, such as academic counselling, the Department of International Affairs, the Registrar's Office, department libraries, student dormitories and cafeterias, are available both in Aachen and in Jülich. While the Jülich site displays a campus atmosphere since all facilities are together in one place, the Aachen site is not a campus university. Its facilities are spread across the city of Aachen in seven buildings, some of which have a long tradition.

International Activities
The FH Aachen maintains partnerships with 170 universities around the world. The students benefit from this cross-border network because it enables them to gain valuable overseas experience in the framework of their studies. The Department of International Affairs is the contact concerning all international topics at the FH Aachen.

Department of International Affairs
The Department of International Affairs provides services for international students, researchers and academic staff, as well as for students of FH Aachen University of Applied Sciences who would like to spend a period abroad. Furthermore, it centralizes, coordinates and handles international cooperation activities at the university.

Some of the activities offered include: support for international students and academic staff, advice for German students who plan to study abroad, coordination of cooperation with international organizations, support in cooperation and partnership agreements with universities worldwide, allocation of scholarships to international and German students, advice to faculties regarding third-party funding and international recruitment, information to the university community about the various international programs available within the scope of higher education, and ensure the presence of the Aachen FH University of Applied Sciences at international educational meetings and forums.

Freshman Institute

The Freshman Program, located in Loherhof, Geilenkirchen, is a private academic organization within the FH Aachen (Aachen University of Applied Sciences). Its aim is to enable international applicants to qualify for a place in a degree program in Germany. Due to the program's special status, the regulations of the German Central Office for External Education Systems (Zentralstelle für ausländisches Bildungswesen, ZAB) are replaced by the program's own entrance examinations, not only for the programs in German but also those offered in the English language, which was approved for the first time with the degree of the MSJK (Ministerium für Schule und Bildung des Landes Nordrhein-Westfalen) of February 2, 2005 to prepare for the English-language courses at the FH Aachen, expanded in 2009 to include consortium partner universities in North Rhine-Westphalia and courses named by them.

The examination, which has total 4 subjects in each exam, each university requires different subjects: Mathematics, Physics/Business Administration, German, English, and Chemistry (only for FeP Students) was based on the framework regulations for foreign students, for teaching at preparatory colleges, and for the assessment test of April 15, 1994 in the currently valid version. The minimum langquage requirements for the graduation from the Freshman program are IELTS Overall Band at least 6.0; German: Level A2 (FH Südwestfalen), B1 (Universität Duisburg-Essen), B2 (FH Aachen). Furthermore, there are other minor subjects, such as Office Courses, and Academic Skills. Besides the final exam, students must conduct 2 months of internship provided by the FH Aachen on Campus Jülich, such as Scientific Programming, Electrical Workshop, Mechanical Workshop, Physics, Chemistry, and Bioanalytics.

After successfully completing the Freshman year, students can apply to any English-language bachelor’s degree program only in North Rhine-Westphalia. Similar in form and function to the first year of a four-year bachelor's degree program that is common in the Anglo-Saxon educational system, the freshman year is financed solely from the fees paid by its students. For the school year 2022-2023, the tuition fee was 19,500€. After the Freshman Program, the university's contribution fee is much cheaper, around 320€ per semester (6 months).

 Partner universities (English-Oriented):
Engineering and Natural Sciences (mostly or partly in German):
 FH Aachen (100% in German): 
• Applied Chemistry
• Electrical Engineering
• Mechanical Engineering
• Medical Engineering
• Physical Engineering
 Universität Duisburg-Essen (ISE programs - 50% in English and 50% in German): *The minimum requirement for Math is 2.0 in German's grading scale* 
• Computer Engineering
• Mechanical Engineering
• Electrical and Electronic Engineering
• Structural Engineering
• Metallurgy and Metal Forming
Business and Economics (100% English):
 FH Südwestfalen:
• Business Administration with Informatics

 Public Transport available: 
Bus GK1: Geilenkirchen Bf - Loherhof
Bus 432: Geilenkirchen Bf - Baesweiler 
Regional train RE4: Aachen - Mönchengladbach - Düsseldorf - Hagen - Dortmund 
 History of the Freshman Program:
2022 
•	The first graduates of the English Track FeP were all been accepted into English-language bachelor's degree programs in North Rhine-Westphalia.
•	Many students in the English to German Track without previous knowledge of German took part in an online beginner German language course in August and September and so were better prepared to start the Freshman Program.
2021
• Through hybrid classes, Freshman students both on campus and still in their home countries could learn together, which was a bit frustrating when some students lived in overseas and had to get up early or stayed up late for the lectures. Also, the timetable was just copied from the period pre-pandemic, therefore, it was not so effective.
• Most of the Freshman students were able to come to Germany and were able to interact with each other on campus.  
• Online entrance exams enabled the participation of applicants worldwide, increasing international diversity. 
• The English Feststellungsprüfung (FeP) program started. After the Freshman program, students can apply to any English-language bachelor’s degree program only in North Rhine-Westphalia.
• No more collaborating with Rhine-Waal University of Applied Sciences.
2020
• Everything was different in 2020, but travel bans, closed embassies, and health and security regulations didn’t stop the Freshman Program 2020/2021 from starting in October 2020. By the end of December 2020, more than half of the students were physically present in Germany.  All the students attended classes together – either online if they were still in their home countries or in classrooms at the Geilenkirchen campus.  Entrance exams were offered regularly online, thus giving more applicants from all over the world the opportunity to join the Freshman Institute.
2019
• The Freshman Institute offers now two new study courses "Rail Vehicle Engineering" and "Optometry" with guaranteed study places.
2018
• The Freshman year in Kenitra, Morocco opens
• New director as of 1 September 2018:  Prof. Dr.-Ing. Josef Hodapp
• The campus Bedburg-Hau is closed  
2017
• Freshman applicants from China, Vietnam, and Mongolia can apply for a visa directly at their consulates without APS, as long as they continue their studies at a university in North Rhine-Westphalia after completion of the Freshman year
2015
• 500 students from 30 countries are enrolled in the Freshman program in the winter semester of 2015
2014
• Due to limited capacity at the Geilenkirchen and Bedburg-Hau campuses, 40 students live and study in Aachen
2013
• Linnich campus is closed
• New student housing is built on the Geilenkirchen campus
2012
• Campus Bedburg-Hau opens with 85 students
2010
• The Geilenkirchen campus expands to include programs in business, humanities, and medicine
• The Forschungszentrum Jülich (Research Centre Jülich) offers the first internships for Freshmen
• 285 students
2009 
• 240 students
• 45 students live and learn in Geilenkirchen at Loherhof and, for the first time, students are prepared to study business
• The Rhine-Waal University of Applied Sciences becomes a partner institution
• 40 state scholarships are granted for the first time
2008 
• 190 students from China, India, Indonesia, and Iran
• Partner universities expanded to include the University Duisburg-Essen (50% in English and 50% in German for all ISE bachelor programs) and the Fachhochschule Südwestfalen (100% in English).
2007 
• Establishment of the Freshman Institute as a central organization of the FH Aachen
• Director:  Professor Herman-Josef Buchkremer
• 130 students, mostly from China, Azerbaijan, and Turkey
2006 
• Approved by the "Akademische Prüfstelle" (APS), 60 students, of which 44 are Chinese
• FH Aachen/Freshman Institute offers its own entrance exam in the home countries of prospective students
• Students live and learn on the Linnich Campus.
2005 
• Establishment of the Freshman program as a model project through the North Rhine-Westphalia (NRW) Department of Education
2002 
• Decrease in the number of students after the establishment of the "Akademische Prüfstelle" (APS) at the German embassy in Beijing and the outbreak of the SARS epidemic
2001 
• Project Director:  Professor Herman-Josef Buchkremer, Rector of the FH Aachen
• The first complete Freshman year under the provisional management of the AcIAS (Aachen Institute of Applied Sciences e.V.) with 30 students from China

Institutes
Institutes are scientific institutions of the university. They bundle competencies to carry out intensive research and development. This takes place in cooperation with institutes of other universities
in Germany and abroad, with research institutions and frequently with industry.
The FH Aachen currently has the following institutes:

 Institute of Building Materials and Construction
 I.F.I. institute for industrial aerodynamics GmbH, institute at the Aachen University of Applied Sciences
 3win-IfiM – Institute of Innovative Mechanical Engineering, institute at the Aachen University of Applied Sciences
 Institute for Thermoprocess Technology GmbH, institute at the Aachen University of Applied Sciences
Campus Jülich
 IAP - Institute of Applied Polymer Chemistry, based at the Aachen University of Applied Sciences in Jülich.
 Institute of Bioengineering
 Institute of Nano- and Biotechnologies
 Institute NOWUM-Energy
 Solar-Institute Jülich

Rectors
 1971-1984: Helmut Strehl
 1984-1987: Hildegard Reitz
 1987-1991: René Flosdorff
 1991-2005: Josef Buchkremer
 2005-2009: Manfred Schulte-Zurhausen
 2009-2021: Marcus Baumann
 from 2021: Bernd Pietschmann

Gallery

References

External links
 FH Aachen Homepage (German)
 FH Aachen WirtschaftsWoche Rankings
 FH Aachen International Oriented Studies Programme
 Freshman Institute
 Information Brochure "Studying at the FH Aachen"
 ISE programm

Universities and colleges in North Rhine-Westphalia
Education in Aachen
1971 establishments in Germany
Educational institutions established in 1971
 
Universities of Applied Sciences in Germany